Aegiae or Aigiai  or Aegaeae or Aigaiai (Αἱγαῖαι) was a town of ancient Laconia, at the distance of 30 stadia from Gythium, supposed by Strabo to be the same as the Homeric Augeiae It possessed a temple and lake of Poseidon.

References

Populated places in ancient Laconia
Former populated places in Greece